The AIMS Best Marathon Runner Award is a running prize which is given annually by the Association of International Marathons and Distance Races (AIMS) to the top male and female marathon runners of the year. Prior to 2013, the award was known as AIMS World Athlete of the Year Award.

Established in 1992, runners receive nominations from the organisers of AIMS member races (over 300 in number) and the man and woman with the most nominations are each given the AIMS Golden Shoe. The athletic footwear company ASICS is a long-time sponsor of the award. There is no designated period in the year for when the awards are given out, but instead runners are given the Golden Shoe in a ceremony preceding their participation in one of the AIMS races.

Those to have received the award include marathon world record holders Haile Gebrselassie and Paula Radcliffe, who have each been given the honour on three separate occasions. Kenyan Tegla Loroupe has the most wins to her name; she won her first award in 1995 and took the honour for three consecutive years from 1997 to 1999. Others to have been nominated as AIMS World Athlete of the Year are Lornah Kiplagat, Uta Pippig, Khalid Khannouchi and Catherine Ndereba. The award is typically given to athletes who have performed well in marathon races, half marathons and road running events in general. One exception to this was when Paul Tergat was given the 1996 award in honour of his 10,000 metres world record on the track and his second victory at the IAAF World Cross Country Championships.

Winners

References

List of winners
AIMS/ASICS World Athlete of the Year Awards. Association of International Marathons and Distance Races. Retrieved on 2011-05-29.

External links
Official AIMS website

Sport of athletics awards
Awards established in 1992